Lapposyrphus is a genus of hoverfly, formerly included in the genus Eupeodes.

Species
Lapposyrphus abberrantis (Curran, 1925)
Lapposyrphus lapponicus (Zetterstedt, 1838)

References

Syrphini
Hoverfly genera